Jacob Muir (born 21 Jan 2002 or 03 May 2002) is an Australian professional soccer player who plays as a defender for Perth Glory.

Muir made his debut for Perth Glory in a FFA Cup match in Adelaide vs. Melbourne Victory on 24 November 2021.

References

Australian Jews
Jewish Australian sportspeople
Jewish footballers
Perth Glory FC players
Living people
2002 births
Australian soccer players
Association football defenders
A-League Men players
National Premier Leagues players